Protobothrops is a genus of venomous pit vipers found in Asia.

The venom of Protobothrops can be diverse and unique across individual organisms of the same and differing species and has demonstrated the ability to evolve in an accelerated manner. One possible explanation for these traits is that the habitat in which Protobothrops reside contains a large variety of prey which may have prompted the diversification of the venom related genes.

Species

References

 
Crotalinae
Snake genera
Taxa named by Alphonse Richard Hoge
Taxa named by Sylvia Alma Renata Wilma de Lemos Romano-Hoge